The Twentieth Century is a 2019 Canadian surrealist comedy-drama film written and directed by Matthew Rankin in his full-length directorial debut. The film portrays a fictionalized portrait of the rise to power of former Canadian Prime Minister William Lyon Mackenzie King as played by Dan Beirne. It won three Canadian Screen Awards.

Historical divergence
The film is not a realistic or literally accurate depiction of Canadian history, instead mixing and matching elements of real history with invented fantasia in a stylized manner reminiscent of the films of Guy Maddin, and taking place largely on deliberately unrealistic sets influenced by German Expressionism, 1940s melodrama and wartime propaganda films. Rankin himself described it as "one part Canadian Heritage Minute and one part ayahuasca death trip".

Although most of the film's major characters are at least loosely based on real Canadian historical figures, not all of their careers actually coexisted. In reality, although Mackenzie King and Arthur Meighen already knew and disliked each other by 1899, neither man had even entered electoral politics at all yet, let alone being candidates for Prime Minister, as of that time — while the real Bert Harper was never a political rival to either man, but merely a government bureaucrat. Harper did genuinely die by drowning, albeit not until 1901, and he drowned while attempting to rescue Bessie Blair, the daughter of New Brunswick premier Andrew George Blair. The real Lord Minto, further, was a benign figure who distinguished himself in Canadian history primarily as a patron of amateur sports, and his term as Governor General had already ended by the time either King or Meighen were in politics — whereas Lord Muto, his fictionalized portrayal in the film, is an openly fascist dictator with much more control over political affairs than Canadian Governors General actually have, who oversees Canadian politics in a manner more reminiscent of The Hunger Games than the real Canadian electoral process, and who is openly conspiring to draw the Canadian military much more deeply into the Boer War. Minto really did have daughters named Ruby and Violet, although both were only teenagers, not adult women, as of 1899. Joseph-Israël Tarte was also a real political figure, although he did not serve concurrently with either King or Meighen and was not strongly associated with the Quebec nationalist movement; he was, however, an opponent of Canadian entry into the Boer War.

According to Rankin, "I wanted everything to feel artificial all the time. The conceit of the film is that Canada might just be totally fake and in this person’s head. And the film is about his head. Everything in the film is drawn from Mackenzie King’s diary and reprocessed. I describe it as a nightmare that he might have had in 1899." He has also described the film as a satire on the overly earnest way that Canadian history is often presented in film and television, contrasting it against both Heritage Minutes and Sullivan Entertainment costume dramas.

The film also makes use of both cross-gender acting, with three significant characters (King's mother, J. Israël Tarte and Lady Violet) portrayed by cross-gender performers in drag, and colour-blind casting, with two White Anglo-Saxon Protestant characters (Bert Harper and Dr. Wakefield) portrayed by Asian-Canadian actors. Rankin has described this aspect of the film by saying that "I wanted to take a school-play approach that you don't see so much in film for some reason. In a school play you can have a Filipino Captain von Trapp and a transgender Artful Dodger and it's fine. In film, I don’t understand why there’s this pressure to always link an actor to their exact demographic profile."

Cast

Release
The film premiered at the 2019 Toronto International Film Festival in the Midnight Madness program, and won the festival's award for Best Canadian First Feature Film. The film was subsequently screened at the 2019 Los Cabos International Film Festival, where it won the festival's Premio Competencia award.

Critical reaction
On review aggregator Rotten Tomatoes, the film has an approval rating of 93% based on 58 reviews, with an average rating of 7.80/10. The website's critical consensus reads, "A silly, surreal treat for fans of absurd comedy, The Twentieth Century takes a sideways -- and often deliriously entertaining -- look at Canadian history." On Metacritic, the film has a weighted average score of 77 out of 100, based on 15 critics, indicating "generally favorable reviews". 

Film critic Peter Howell described the film as "Monty Python by way of Rankin’s fellow Winnipegger Guy Maddin", while David Friend of The Canadian Press said the film "subverts the mystique around politicians by mocking patriotism, propaganda and Canadian identity."

For The Hollywood Reporter, Jordan Mintzer described the film as "Guy Maddin meets John Waters by way of Powell and Pressburger".

Accolades
In December 2019, the film was named to TIFF's annual year-end Canada's Top Ten list. The film received eight Canadian Screen Award nominations at the 8th Canadian Screen Awards in 2020.

References

External links
 
 
 

2019 films
2019 directorial debut films
Canadian comedy-drama films
Cross-dressing in film
Films directed by Matthew Rankin
Films about prime ministers
Films set in 1899
Films set in Canada
Canadian political satire films
Surrealist films
William Lyon Mackenzie King
2019 comedy-drama films
2010s English-language films
English-language Canadian films
Canadian identity
2010s Canadian films